The Revolutionary Internationalist Action Groups (GARI) was an anarchist and anti-Francoist terrorist group in France in the 1970s.

History 
GARI was founded after the execution by Spain's Francoist regime of the Spanish anarchist Salvador Puig Antich and the crackdown by the Spanish police of the Iberian Liberation Movement Movimiento Ibérico de Liberación (MIL), the outfit to which Salvador Puig Antich belonged.

Based mainly in the south of France around Toulouse, the group was formed by French and Spanish anti-fascists. Several GARI members, among whom Jean-Marc Rouillan, a former member of the Iberian Liberation Movement, would later create the leftist terrorist group Action directe.

It was responsible for a car bombing against an Iberia Airlines office in Brussels, Belgium, that injured two people.

See also 
 Anarchism in France
 Communist terrorism
 Iberian Liberation Movement

References 

Anti-Francoism
Autonomism
Communist organizations in France
Communist terrorism
Defunct anarchist militant groups
Defunct communist militant groups
Far-left politics in France
Left-wing militant groups in France
Socialist parties in France
Terrorism in France